Eriopsis is a genus of flowering plants from the orchid family, Orchidaceae. Its species are native to South America and Central America.

Eriopsis biloba Lindl.
Eriopsis grandibulbosa Ames & C.Schweinf.
Eriopsis mesae Kraenzl.
Eriopsis rutidobulbon Hook.
Eriopsis sceptrum Rchb.f. & Warsz.

See also 
 List of Orchidaceae genera

References 

  (1847) Edward's Botanical Register, 33: t. 18.
  2005. Handbuch der Orchideen-Namen. Dictionary of Orchid Names. Dizionario dei nomi delle orchidee. Ulmer, Stuttgart
  (2009) Epidendroideae (Part two). Genera Orchidacearum 5: 88. Oxford University Press.

External links 

Cymbidieae genera
Cymbidieae